Linda Spalding (née Dickinson; June 25, 1943) is a Canadian writer and editor. Born in Topeka, Kansas, the daughter of Jacob Alan Dickinson and Edith Senner, she lived in Mexico and Hawaii before moving to Toronto, Ontario in 1982. 

She has two daughters, Esta and Kristin Spalding, from her first marriage to photographer Philip Spalding.  Spalding later married Canadian novelist Michael Ondaatje; Linda, Esta and Michael are also on the editorial board of the national literary magazine, Brick. 

Spalding's work has been honoured numerous times; her non-fiction work, The Follow, was shortlisted for the Trillium Book Award and the Writers' Trust Non-Fiction Prize. She has since received the Harbourfront Festival Prize for her contribution to the Canadian literary community and, in 2012, the Governor-General's Literary Award for her novel, The Purchase. 

Spalding has worked as a professor of English and writing at the University of Hawaii, York University, the University of Guelph, Brown University (where she was writer-in-residence in 1991), the University of Toronto and Ryerson University. She has also taught creative writing at Humber College's School for Writers. Prior to this, she has worked as a manager for Hawaii Public Television and as the director of a child care services agency in Kailua, Hawaii.

Bibliography
 Daughters of Captain Cook (1987)
 The Paper Wife (1994)
 The Follow / A Dark Place in the Jungle: Following Leakey's Last Angel into Borneo (1999)
 Riska (1999)
 The Brick Reader - (1999) (edited with Michael Ondaatje)
 Lost Classics - (2000, Knopf Canada) (edited with Michael Redhill, Esta Spalding and Michael Ondaatje)
 Mere - (2001, HarperFlamingo Canada) (with Esta Spalding)
 Who Named The Knife  (2005)
 The Purchase (2012)
 A Reckoning (2017)

References

1943 births
Living people
Writers from Topeka, Kansas
American expatriate writers in Canada
Writers from Toronto
Harbourfront Festival Prize winners
Canadian women novelists
Governor General's Award-winning fiction writers
20th-century Canadian novelists
21st-century Canadian novelists
20th-century Canadian women writers
21st-century Canadian women writers